Bipartisan Cafe is a coffee shop in Portland, Oregon's Montavilla neighborhood, in the United States.

Description 
The interior features framed posters of John F. Kennedy and Richard Nixon, as well as portraits of Geronimo, Martin Luther King Jr., and Harriet Tubman.

History 
The cafe was founded by Peter Emerson.

Reception 
In 2020, Thrillist's Pete Cottell included Bipartisan Cafe in his list of "Portland's Best Coffee Shops With WiFi".

References

External links

 
 
 Bipartisan Cafe at Zomato

Montavilla, Portland, Oregon
Restaurants in Portland, Oregon
Southeast Portland, Oregon
Year of establishment missing